Giga sport or variation, may refer to:

 Gigasports, a Chinese sportswear retailer
 Gigasport, a sports equipment retailer owned by Kastner & Öhler
 GIGA Sport, a Polish monthly magazine founded by Tomasz Sommer

See also

 Megasport (disambiguation)
 Hypersport (disambiguation)
 Super sport (disambiguation)
 Sport (disambiguation)
 Giga (disambiguation)